Matteo Soncin (born 28 March 2001) is an Italian professional footballer who plays as a goalkeeper for  club Pergolettese.

Club career
Born in Adria, Soncin started his career on AC Milan youth system. After five years in the club, on 15 August 2020 he left AC Milan and joined Serie C club Pergolettese. 

Soncin made his Pergolettese and Professional debut on 7 April 2021 against Renate.

References

External links
 
 

2001 births
Living people
People from Adria
Footballers from Veneto
Italian footballers
Association football goalkeepers
Serie C players
A.C. Milan players
U.S. Pergolettese 1932 players
Italy youth international footballers
Sportspeople from the Province of Rovigo